Boese is a surname. Notable people with the surname include:

Carl Boese (1887–1958), German film director, screenwriter, and producer
Kristin Boese (born 1977), German kitesurfer
Kurt Boese (1929–2021), Canadian wrestler
Ursula Boese (1928–2016), German opera singer

See also
Bose (surname)